The Castrol Technology Centre is a research institute owned by BP in South Oxfordshire, north of Whitchurch-on-Thames.

History

Castrol
Castrol was founded by C.C.Wakefield in 1899, making lubricants (Wakefield lubricator) for railways.

The research site is based at Bozedown House, a former private residence originally built by William Fanning c.1870 and then rebuilt by Charles Palmer in 1907  after the original house was destroyed by fire.  It became a chemical research site in the 1950s and was purchased by Castrol in 1976.

In 1993 it won the Queen's Award for Technological Achievement for its Castrol Marine Cyltech 80. Castrol employs around 7,000 staff worldwide. Castrol was bought by BP in 2000.

Structure
The site is around three-quarters of a mile north of the River Thames, east of the B471, accessed from the A4074 at Woodcote. The site has around 500 staff.

Function
Castrol has twelve research sites around the world. The site at Pangbourne is the largest of the twelve sites. Research is done on rheology and the viscosity of engine oil.

See also
 Former Esso Research Centre in Oxfordshire
 Former Shell Technology Centre in Cheshire

References

External links
 Where we operate on BP website
 CASTROL R&D: research (archived, 13 Mar 2015)

BP buildings and structures
Chemical research institutes
Motor oils
Research institutes established in 1907
Research institutes in Oxfordshire
South Oxfordshire District
1907 establishments in England